John Mill (1474/76–1551) was an English politician.

He was a Member (MP) of the Parliament of England for Southampton in 1529 and 1539.

References

1470s births
1551 deaths
English MPs 1529–1536
English MPs 1539–1540